Eugene Gabriel Sayegh (7 May 1900 – 30 July 1988) was the first barrister in Australia of syrian descent.

Personal life 
He moved from Auckland, New Zealand in 1917 where he had attended Sacred Heart College, and went onto study at Sydney University. He was admitted to the bar in New South Wales in 1924, which made him the only Syrian barrister practising in the Commonwealth at the time.

In January 1928 Sayegh married Zoe Malouf, with whom he had 3 children. Sayegh retired in 1984 and died on 30 July 1988.

Career 
In 1946 Sayegh defeated Bill Dovey QC in a famous sydney divorce case.

References

1900 births
1988 deaths
Australian people of Lebanese descent
New Zealand emigrants to Australia
Australian solicitors
Australian barristers